Gross negligence is the "lack of slight diligence or care" or "a conscious, voluntary act or omission in reckless disregard of a legal duty and of the consequences to another party." In some jurisdictions a person injured as a result of gross negligence may be able to recover punitive damages from the person who caused the injury or loss.

Negligence is the opposite of diligence, or being careful. The standard of ordinary negligence is what conduct deviates from the proverbial "reasonable person". By extension, if somebody has been grossly negligent, that means they have fallen so far below the ordinary standard of care that one can expect, to warrant the label of being "gross". Gross negligence may thus be described as reflecting "the want of even slight or scant care", falling below the level of care that even a careless person would be expected to follow. While some jurisdictions equate the culpability of gross negligence with that of recklessness, most differentiate it from simple negligence in its degree.

Criminal law
Gross negligence is used as a standard for criminal law, for example, under manslaughter in English law. Under common law, criminal negligence is defined as a gross deviation from a reasonable standard of care. This is a higher standard than ordinary negligence under tort law.

In the U.K., a conviction for gross negligence manslaughter requires that the prosecutor prove the existence of a duty of care, breach of that duty by the defendant resulting in death, and a risk of death that would be obvious to a reasonable prudent person in the position of the defendant.

Private law

English law

The concept of gross negligence is broadly distrusted by English law. In Wilson v Brett, Baron Rolfe (later Lord Cranworth) said he:

This view has been consistently approved in English law relating to fiduciary duties, as the courts have reasserted that there is only one standard of culpable carelessness: ordinary negligence. The preferred view has been that the context of a trustee, company director or other fiduciary's judgment is to be taken into account when the judge reviews the exercise of discretion. In Houghland v RR Low (Luxury Coaches) Ltd Ormerod LJ said,

The leading case is Armitage v Nurse where Millett LJ, was asked to decide whether an exclusion clause was effective to absolve a trustee from an accusation of negligence when applying property to beneficiaries. It was held that exclusion clauses were still effective (though other remedies could follow, such as UCTA 1977 in a contract law case) but on the point of principle, as a default position all trustees are liable for ordinary negligence. Millett LJ said,

United States
Under United States law, proof of gross negligence involves proving all of the elements of an ordinary negligence action, plus the additional element that the defendant acted in reckless disregard of, or with a lack of substantial concern for, the rights of others. For some causes of action that might trigger defenses such as governmental immunity, it may be necessary to prove gross negligence in order to overcome the defense.

Roman law

Roman lawyers had an axiom that gross negligence amounts to an intentional wrong, or culpa lata dolo aequiparatur.

See also
Negligence

Notes

Common law legal terminology